Conrad Joseph Osman (September 5, 1897 – September 11, 1948) was a Canadian politician. He served in the Legislative Assembly of New Brunswick as member of the Albert party representing Albert County from 1927 to 1930.

References

20th-century Canadian politicians
1897 births
1948 deaths
Progressive Conservative Party of New Brunswick MLAs